Micromyrtus collina is a plant species of the family Myrtaceae endemic to Western Australia.

The densely branched shrub is found on sand plains in the Mid West region of Western Australia near Geraldton.

References

collina
Endemic flora of Western Australia
Myrtales of Australia
Rosids of Western Australia
Endangered flora of Australia
Plants described in 2010
Taxa named by Barbara Lynette Rye